Nagendra Singh Yadav (born 22 November 1961) also known as Munna Yadav is an Indian politician and presently Member of Legislative Assembly (MLA) from Samajwadi Party representing Sadar Vidhan Sabha Assembly Constituency of Pratapgarh district in Uttar Pradesh.

Early life 
Nagendra Singh alias Munna Yadav was born to father Late Bhishmdev Yadav and mother Kamla Devi a Hindu Ahir (Yadav) family of Uttar Pradesh. He completed graduation in Law from the University of Allahabad in 1982. Nagendra is a professional lawyer who has been elected in Uttar Pradesh Assembly Election 2012 from Pratapgarh constituency.

Career 
Nagendra Singh Yadav started his political career as independent member of legislative assembly in the assembly election 2007 in Pratapgarh Vidhan Sabha constituency and secured 6000 votes. In 2012 from the ticket of Samajwadi Party Yadav won the assembly election against Bahujan Samajwadi Party's candidate Sanjay by margin of 7510 votes in Pratapgarh constituency Uttar Pradesh Assembly Election.

See also 
 Pratapgarh (Lok Sabha constituency)
 Sadar
 2007 Uttar Pradesh assembly elections

References

External links
  Uttar Pradesh Assembly Election 2012 website
 Nagendra Singh Munna Yadav Official Facebook

1961 births
Living people
People from Pratapgarh, Uttar Pradesh
Uttar Pradesh MLAs 2017–2022